Lee Jong-kyung may refer to:

Lee Jong-kyung (volleyball) (born 1962), South Korean volleyball player
Lee Jong-kyung (sledge hockey) (born 1973), South Korean sledge hockey player